The cardinal ligament (also transverse cervical ligament, lateral cervical ligament, or Mackenrodt's ligament) is a major ligament of the uterus formed as a thickening of connective tissue of the base of the broad ligament of the uterus. It extends laterally (on either side) from the cervix and vaginal fornix to attach onto the lateral wall of the pelvis. The female ureter, uterine artery, and inferior hypogastric (nervous) plexus course within the cardinal ligament. The cardinal ligament supports the uterus.

Structure 
The cardinal ligament is a paired structure on the lateral side of the uterus. It originates from the lateral part of the cervix.

Attachments 
It attaches the cervix to the lateral pelvic wall by its attachment to the obturator fascia of the obturator internus muscle. It attaches to the uterosacral ligament.

Relations 
It is continuous externally with the fibrous tissue surrounding the pelvic blood vessels.

Function 
The cardinal ligament supports the uterus, providing lateral stability to the cervix.

Clinical significance 
The cardinal ligament may be affected in hysterectomy. Due to its proximity to the ureters, it can get damaged during ligation of the ligament. It is routinely cut during some uterine operations, although this can have side effects.

See also
 Pelvic splanchnic nerves

References

External links
 
 

Mammal female reproductive system
Ligaments